The Lagos West Senatorial District in Lagos State, Nigeria covers the local government areas of Agege, Ajeromi-Ifelodun, Alimosho, Amuwo-Odofin, Badagry, Ifako-Ijaiye, Ikeja, Mushin, Ojo, and Oshodi-Isolo. The senator currently representing the district is Solomon Adeola of the All Progressives Congress who was first elected in 2015.

List of Senators

References 

Politics of Lagos State
Senatorial districts in Nigeria
Members of the Senate (Nigeria)